José Dutra dos Santos (born 26 January 1948), sometimes known as just Dutra, is a Brazilian former football player and manager.

Career
Dutra was born in Rio de Janeiro, Rio de Janeiro state. He played at Bonsucesso, Vasco, Vitória and Remo, and participated of the 1968 Olympic Games in Mexico City.

Among the clubs he managed, are Sampaio Corrêa, Moto Club, Maranhão, Rio Negro, Paysandu, Tuna Luso, Remo, Anapolina, Ferroviário the Tunisia national team and Moroccan club Wydad Athletic Club. On 26 September 2011, he resigned from his position with Wydad. In 2009 he managed in Sudan and Libya. He last managed CS Constantine in the Algerian Ligue Professionnelle 1, before resigning his position due to health reasons.

References

1948 births
Living people
Footballers from Rio de Janeiro (city)
Brazilian footballers
Association football defenders
Bonsucesso Futebol Clube players
CR Vasco da Gama players
Clube do Remo players
Esporte Clube Vitória players
Olympic footballers of Brazil
Footballers at the 1968 Summer Olympics
Brazilian football managers
Botola managers
Étoile Sportive du Sahel managers
Al Nassr FC managers
Al-Hilal Club (Omdurman) managers
Al-Ahly SC (Benghazi) managers
Wydad AC managers
CS Constantine managers
Brazilian expatriate football managers
Expatriate football managers in Tunisia
Brazilian expatriate sportspeople in Tunisia
Expatriate football managers in Saudi Arabia
Brazilian expatriate sportspeople in Saudi Arabia
Expatriate football managers in Sudan
Brazilian expatriate sportspeople in Sudan
Expatriate football managers in Libya
Brazilian expatriate sportspeople in Libya
Expatriate football managers in Morocco
Brazilian expatriate sportspeople in Morocco
Expatriate football managers in Algeria
Brazilian expatriate sportspeople in Algeria